Mater dei is a 1950 Italian drama film directed by Emilio Cordero.

It is the first Italian film shot in color.

Cast
Giorgio Costantini
Myriam De Mayo
Anna Maria Alegiani
Bianca Doria
Giulio Calì
Orlando Baralla
Viva Bertoncello
Ida Bracci Dorati
Rita Galgano
Enzo Hassan
Elfriede Jera
Mario Lodolini
Ileana Simova	... 	Virgin Mary
Michel Sorel

References

External links
 

1950 films
1950s Italian-language films
1950 drama films
Italian drama films
1950s Italian films